Pristimantis pinguis is a species of frog in the family Strabomantidae. It is endemic to Peru where it is known from the region of its type locality in the Celendín Province as well as from the western slopes of the Cordillera Occidental in the Cajamarca Region.
Its natural habitat is tropical high-altitude grassland at elevations of  asl. This little-known species is potentially threatened by habitat loss caused by agricultural development.

References

pinguis
Endemic fauna of Peru
Amphibians of Peru
Amphibians of the Andes
Amphibians described in 1999
Taxonomy articles created by Polbot